Belvata is a census town in Mysore district in the state of Karnataka, India.

Demographics
 India census, Belvata had a population of 5627. Males constitute 52% of the population and females 48%. Belvata has an average literacy rate of 72%, higher than the national average of 59.5%; with 55% of the males and 45% of females literate. 12% of the population is under 6 years of age.

References

Cities and towns in Mysore district